Sergey Yuryevich Maslov (born 3 September 1990) is a Russian former professional association football player.

Club career
He made his professional debut in the Russian First Division in 2010 for FC Khimki.

External links
 

1990 births
Footballers from Moscow
Living people
Russian footballers
Association football forwards
FC Moscow players
FC Khimki players
FC Arsenal Tula players
Russian Premier League players
Russian First League players
Russian Second League players